Calzada or La Calzada may refer to:

Places

Spain
La Calzada de Béjar, a municipality in the province of Salamanca
Calzada de Calatrava, a municipality in the province of Ciudad Real
Calzada de Don Diego, a municipality in the province of Salamanca
Calzada de Oropesa, a municipality in the province of Toledo
Calzada de Valdunciel, a municipality in the province of Salamanca
Calzada de los Molinos, a municipality in the province of Palencia
Calzada del Coto, a municipality in the province of León
Cabezabellosa de la Calzada, a municipality in the province of Salamanca
Puebla de la Calzada, a municipality in the province of Badajoz
Rabé de las Calzadas, a municipality in the province of Burgos
Santo Domingo de la Calzada, a municipality in La Rioja
Torrejón de la Calzada, a municipality in the Community of Madrid
Valdelacalzada, a municipality in the province of Badajoz

Latin America
Calzada (mountain), a mountain in the Bolivian Andes
Calzada, Maunabo, Puerto Rico, a barrio in Maunabo, Puerto Rico
Calzada District, Moyobamba, Peru
Calzada Larga, Panama
Calzada Larga Airport, Panama
Rafael Calzada, Buenos Aires, Argentina
La Calzada, a street in Granada, Nicaragua

People with the surname
Dominic de la Calzada (1019–1109), Spanish saint
Paz de la Calzada, Spanish-born American visual artist
José Calzada (born 1964), Mexican politician
Juan Ismael Calzada, Mexican botanist
Humberto Calzada (born 1944), Cuban-American artist
Marco Antonio Calzada (born 1964), Mexican politician
Maximiliano Calzada (born 1990), Uruguayan footballer
Ricky Calzada (born 1953), Puerto Rican basketball player
Rocío Colette Acuña Calzada (born 1982), Mexican singer